Ulu-Yalan (Oloyalan) is a rural locality (a village) in Isanbayevsky Selsoviet, Ilishevsky District, Bashkortostan, Russia. The population was 88 as of 2010. There are 2 streets.

Geography 
Ulu-Yalan is located 23 km northwest of Verkhneyarkeyevo (the district's administrative centre) by road. Isanbayevo is the nearest rural locality.

References 

Rural localities in Ilishevsky District